Jamboree 2008 may refer to:

Jamboree 2008 (Ireland)
Jamboree 2008 (Northumberland)